CDO-Squared is a collateralized debt obligations backed primarily by the tranches issued by other CDOs. These instruments became popular before the financial crisis of 2007–08. There were 36 CDO-Squared deals made in 2005, 48 in 2006 and 41 in 2007. Merrill Lynch was a big producer, creating and selling 11 of them.

The collapse of the market for collateralized debt obligations and CDO-Squared contributed to the 2008 subprime mortgage crisis. Goldman Sachs
appears to be the last bank to hold CDOs-Squared, holding $50 million in June 2018.

2004 
Abacus 2004-2
Abacus 2004-3
ACA 2004-1
Cascade Funding I
Crystal Cove
Davis Square Funding III
Dunhill
E-Trade III
Glacier Funding I
Glacier Funding II
Independence V
Jupiter High Grade
Lakeside II
Sierra Madre Funding

2005 
Abacus 2005-1
Abacus 2005-2
Abacus 2005-3
Abacus 2005-5
Adirondack 2005-1
Altius I Funding
Broderick 1
Camber 3 Plc
Class V Funding
Coolidge Funding
Davis Square Funding IV
E-Trade IV
Fort Sheridan
Glacier Funding III 
G Street Finance
Huntington
Independence VI
Jupiter High Grade I
Jupiter High Grade II
Jupiter High Grade III
Khaleej II
Kleros Preferred Funding
Lenox
Lexington Capital Funding

2006 
Auriga
Bernoulli High Grade I
Broadwick Funding
Broderick 2
Class V Funding II
Commodore V
Davis Square Funding VI
Fortius II Funding
GSC 2006-2m
Hout Bay 2006-1
Hudson High Grade Funding 2006-1
Hudson Mezzanine Funding 2006-1
Independence VII
Ipswich Street
Jupiter High Grade IV
Kleros Preferred Funding II
Kleros Preferred Funding III
Kleros Real Estate I
Kleros Real Estate II
Kleros Real Estate III
Libertas Preferred Funding I
Octans I
Pampelonne I
West Coast Funding I

2007 
Abacus 2007-AC1
Glacier Funding V
Newbury Street
Norma I
Point Pleasant 2007-1
Timberwolf 1
Vertical 2007-1
Volans

References

Sources 
 

Derivatives (finance)
United States housing bubble